In the 2009–10 season, USM Blida is competing in the National for the 25th season, as well as the Algerian Cup. They will be competing in Ligue 1, and the Algerian Cup.

Squad list
Players and squad numbers last updated on 18 November 2009.Note: Flags indicate national team as has been defined under FIFA eligibility rules. Players may hold more than one non-FIFA nationality.

Competitions

Overview

{| class="wikitable" style="text-align: center"
|-
!rowspan=2|Competition
!colspan=8|Record
!rowspan=2|Started round
!rowspan=2|Final position / round
!rowspan=2|First match	
!rowspan=2|Last match
|-
!
!
!
!
!
!
!
!
|-
| National

|  
| 14th
| 6 August 2009
| 31 May 2010
|-
| Algerian Cup

| Round of 64 
| Round of 16
| 25 September 2009
| 16 March 2010
|-
! Total

National

League table

Results summary

Results by round

Matches

Algerian Cup

Squad information

Playing statistics

|-
! colspan=10 style=background:#dcdcdc; text-align:center| Goalkeepers

|-
! colspan=10 style=background:#dcdcdc; text-align:center| Defenders

|-
! colspan=10 style=background:#dcdcdc; text-align:center| Midfielders

|-
! colspan=10 style=background:#dcdcdc; text-align:center| Forwards

|-
! colspan=10 style=background:#dcdcdc; text-align:center| Players transferred out during the season

Goalscorers

Transfers

In

Out

References

External links
 2009–10 USM Blida season at dzfoot.com 

USM Blida seasons
Algerian football clubs 2009–10 season